George Henry Williamson (14 January 1845 – March 1918) was a British tinplate and sheet metal manufacturer, and Conservative Party politician.

He was elected at the general election in January 1906 as the Member of Parliament (MP) for the borough of Worcester.
However, an election petition was lodged, and Williamson's election was declared void on 25 May 1906. The writ of election was suspended and a Royal Commission was established.  Their report was published in December, concluding that there had been extensive corruption.  New writs were proposed unsuccessfully on 17 December 1906 and 14 February 1907, and the writ was not finally moved until 31 January 1908.

Williamson did not stand for Parliament again.

References

External links 
 

1845 births
1918 deaths
Williamson, George Henry
Members of the Parliament of the United Kingdom for Worcester
UK MPs 1906–1910
19th-century English businesspeople